Udhar Ka Sindur is a 1976 Indian Hindi-language drama film, produced by L. V. Prasad under the Prasad Productions Pvt. Ltd. banner, directed by Chander Vohra. The film stars Jeetendra, Reena Roy and Asha Parekh, with music composed by Rajesh Roshan. It film is a remake of the Telugu film Manushullo Devudu (1974). Parekh received a Filmfare nomination for Best Supporting Actress, the only nomination for the film.

Plot 
Raja, as a child was adopted and raised by Dr. Shivnath, a kind and generous man. Sudha, his daughter accepts Raja as her own brother, but Shivnath's wife and son Premnath always shun him. Butta Singh, a rickshaw driver meets Raja's lost sister Sita and raises her as his own sister. Raja, along with Premnath goes to Bangalore to learn the law. Raja studies hard while his brother Premnath gets involved with gambling. Sudha's marriage is fixed, but when Dr. Shivnath is arranging funds for the dowry, he is faced by some moneylenders who had lent his son money. Due to this, Shivnath get a paralytic attack and becomes handicapped. He loses all his money in repaying his son's debts. Raja loves a girl named Rekha, but sacrifices his love so that he can marry a rich girl named Shanta to raise enough money to arrange Sudha's marriage. On the wedding day, he discovers that Rekha is the sister of Shanta, he is marrying.

Cast 

Jeetendra as Rajkumar / Raja
Reena Roy as Rekha
Asha Parekh as Shantha
Asrani as Buta Singh
Om Shivpuri as Dr. Shivnath
Satyendra Kapoor as Bishambernath
Paintal as Sunder Prasad
Vikas Anand Inspector Chauhan
Kamal Kapoor as Superintendent of Police
Manmohan Krishna as Durga Prasad
Dheeraj Kumar as Premnath
Dhumal
Urmila Bhatt as Janki
Prema Narayan as Munni / Sita
Jayshree T.
Rita Bhaduri as Sudha
Manju Asrani as Julie Verma
Ashalata Wabgaonkar
Shobha Desai

Soundtrack

References 

1970s Hindi-language films
1976 drama films
1976 films
Films scored by Rajesh Roshan
Hindi remakes of Telugu films
Hindi-language drama films
Indian drama films

External links